South SEED LPDH College is a collaboration of the school Southville International School and Colleges and Las Piñas Doctors Hospital. The president of the school is Marl V. Ferenal.

Sister schools
Southville International School affiliated with Foreign Universities (SISFU)
Southville International School and Colleges
South Mansfield College
Stonyhurst Southville International School

External links
South SEED LPDH College official website

Education in Las Piñas
International schools in Metro Manila
Universities and colleges in Metro Manila
Educational institutions established in 1990
1990 establishments in the Philippines